Eric Heuvel (born 25 May 1960, Amsterdam) is a Dutch comic book artist best known for his graphic novels about World War II.

Bibliography
 January Jones
 Dodenrit naar Monte Carlo
 De Schedel van Sultan Mkwawa
 De Schatten van Koning Salomo
 Het Pinkerton Draaiboek
 De Horens van de Stier
 Het graf van de Zeppelin

 Bud Broadway
 De weg naar Java
 Het geheim van Raffles
 Banzai op Borneo
 Het einde van Indië
 Show in de Sahara
 De toorts van Caesar
 De dubbele Duce
 De lange weg naar huis

 Geheim van de tijd (eng: Secrets of history)
 De weg naar Java
 Het geheim van Raffles
 Banzai op Borneo
 Het einde van Indië
 Show in de Sahara
 De toorts van Caesar
 De dubbele Duce
 De lange weg naar huis

 De ontdekking (eng: A Family Secret)
 De schuilhoek (eng: The shelter)
 Frontstad Rotterdam (eng: Front city Rotterdam)
 De zoektocht (eng: The Search)
 De terugkeer (eng: The return)

Awards
He is the winner of the 2012 Stripschapprijs.

References

1960 births
Living people
Dutch cartoonists
Artists from Amsterdam
Winners of the Stripschapsprijs